The 2009 UEFS Futsal Women's Championship was the 4th women's UEFS futsal championship, held in Paczków (Poland).

Belgium withdrew meaning that only seven teams were in the competition.

Teams

Group stage

Group A

Group B

Final round

Semifinals

5th-6th places

Friendly match

FINAL

* Galicia was disqualified

Final standings

External links
UEFS website
UEFS blog

UEFS Futsal Women's Championship
UEFS
2009–10 in Polish football
International futsal competitions hosted by Poland